Telecrates is a genus of moths of the family Xyloryctidae.

Species
 Telecrates basileia (Turner, 1902)
 Telecrates desmochrysa Lower, 1896
 Telecrates laetiorella (Walker, 1864)
 Telecrates melanochrysa (Turner, 1939)
 Telecrates tesselata Lucas, 1900

References

 
Xyloryctidae
Xyloryctidae genera